Stilbon (Greek: Στίλβων), in the ancient Greek religion, is the sky god of Hermaon, the planet Mercury, and one of the Astra Planeta. The word, Stilbon, means shining. This new name was introduced following the confusion caused by an overabundance of astronomical names.

See also
 List of Greek mythological figures

References

Greek gods
Sky and weather gods
Mercurian deities